The Eastern Shore Delegation refers to the members of the Maryland House of Delegates who reside in or represent legislative districts that are in or include parts of the Eastern Shore of Maryland in the United States of America. Three delegates are elected from each district, though some districts are divided into sub-districts.

Current members

Notes

See also
 Current members of the Maryland State Senate

References

External links
 Maryland General Assembly

Delegations in the Maryland General Assembly